In enzymology, a 5-(carboxyamino)imidazole ribonucleotide synthase is an enzyme that catalyzes the chemical reaction

ATP + 5-amino-1-(5-phospho-D-ribosyl)imidazole + HCO3−  ADP + phosphate + 5-carboxyamino-1-(5-phospho-D-ribosyl)imidazole

The 3 substrates of this enzyme are ATP, 5-amino-1-(5-phospho-D-ribosyl)imidazole ("AIR"), and HCO3−, whereas its 3 products are ADP, phosphate, and 5-carboxyamino-1-(5-phospho-D-ribosyl)imidazole.

This enzyme belongs to the family of ligases, specifically those forming generic carbon-nitrogen bonds.  The systematic name of this enzyme class is 5-amino-1-(5-phospho-D-ribosyl)imidazole:carbon-dioxide ligase (ADP-forming).

References

 
 
 

EC 6.3.4
Enzymes of unknown structure